"For God Is with Us" is a song performed by an Australian Christian pop duo For King & Country. The song was released as the second single from their fifth studio album, What Are We Waiting For? (2022), on 24 September 2021. The song was written by Joel Smallbone, Jordan Reynolds, Josh Kerr, and Luke Smallbone.

"For God Is with Us" peaked at No. 1 on the US Hot Christian Songs chart. The song was ranked by Billboard as the fifth biggest Christian song in 2022. "For God Is with Us" was nominated for the GMA Dove Award for Short Form Video of the Year (Performance) at the 2022 GMA Dove Awards. The version of the song with Hillary Scott received a nomination for the Grammy Award for Best Contemporary Christian Music Performance/Song at the 2023 Grammy Awards.

Background
On September 21, 2021, For King & Country announced that they would be releasing "For God Is with Us" as a single on September 24, 2021. "For God Is with Us" is a follow-up to the duo's single "Relate" which was released in August 2021. Joel Smallbone shared the story behind the song, saying:

Composition

Reception

Critical response
Jonathan Andre of 365 Days of Inspiring Media gave a positive review of "For God Is with Us", saying, "For King & Country's new song is as joyous as it is poignant, as orchestral as it is resounding and compelling. Joel and Luke have crafted together a song that deeply proclaims so earnestly and fiercely that our God is with us, in the moments of yesteryear when He was born God incarnate as Jesus all those years ago, and is also with us now, even during moments when we may not 'see' or 'feel' Him also."

Accolades

Commercial performance
"For God Is With Us" debuted at number 43 on the US Hot Christian Songs chart dated 9 October 2021, concurrently charting at No. 3 on the Christian Digital Song Sales chart.

Music videos
The official music video of "For God Is with Us" was published on For King & Country's YouTube channel on 24 September 2021. The video shows the duo appearing in "an array of locations, from valleys to cityscapes, driving home that God is with us no matter the time or place." The official lyric video of the song was uploaded on YouTube on 29 November 2021.

Track listing

Charts

Weekly charts

Year-end charts

Release history

References

External links
 

2021 singles
2021 songs
For King & Country (band) songs
Contemporary Christian songs
Songs written by Joel Smallbone
Word Records singles